Sisicottus is a genus of sheet weavers that was first described by S. C. Bishop & C. R. Crosby in 1938. They can be found in moss and litter of conifer forests.

Species
 it contains nine species, found in Russia, the United States, Canada and on the Kuril Islands:
Sisicottus aenigmaticus Miller, 1999 – USA
Sisicottus crossoclavis Miller, 1999 – USA, Canada
Sisicottus cynthiae Miller, 1999 – USA
Sisicottus montanus (Emerton, 1882) (type) – USA, Canada
Sisicottus montigena Bishop & Crosby, 1938 – USA
Sisicottus nesides (Chamberlin, 1921) – USA, Canada
Sisicottus orites (Chamberlin, 1919) – USA, Canada
Sisicottus panopeus Miller, 1999 – USA, Canada, Russia (Kurile Is.)
Sisicottus quoylei Miller, 1999 – USA, Canada

See also
 List of Linyphiidae species (Q–Z)

References

Araneomorphae genera
Linyphiidae
Spiders of North America
Spiders of Russia